Conceição may refer to:

Places

Brazil
Conceição River (disambiguation)

Bahia
Conceição do Almeida
Conceição do Coité
Conceição do Jacuípe

Espírito Santo
Conceição da Barra
Conceição do Castelo

Maranhão
Conceição do Lago-Açu

Minas Gerais
Conceição da Aparecida
Conceição da Barra de Minas
Conceição das Alagoas
Conceição das Pedras
Conceição de Ipanema
Conceição do Mato Dentro
Conceição do Pará
Conceição do Rio Verde
Conceição dos Ouros

Pará
Conceição do Araguaia

Paraíba
Conceição, Paraíba

Piauí
Conceição do Canindé

Rio de Janeiro
Conceição de Macabu

São Paulo
Conceição (São Paulo Metro), a railway station

Tocantins
Conceição do Tocantins

Portugal
Conceição (Covilhã), a parish in Covilhã
Conceição e Estoi, a parish in Faro
Conceição (Horta), a parish in the district of Horta
Conceição (Ourique), a parish in Ourique
Conceição (Peniche), a parish in the district of Peniche
Conceição (Ribeira Grande), a parish in the district of Ribeira Grande
Conceição de Tavira, a former parish in Tavira
Conceição e Cabanas de Tavira, a parish in Tavira
Conceição (Vila Viçosa), a parish in Vila Viçosa

People
Conceição (surname)
Conceição Andrade (born 1940), Brazilian lawyer and politician
Conceição Evaristo (born 1946), Brazilian writer
Conceição Ferreira (born 1962), Portuguese long-distance runner
Conceição Geremias (born 1956), Brazilian heptathlete
Conceição Lima (born 1961), Santomean poet
Conceição Matos (born 1936), Portuguese communist and political prisoner
Conceição Rodrigues (born 1919), Portuguese footballer

See also
Orfeu da Conceição, stage play with music by Vinicius de Moraes and Antônio Carlos Jobim

Portuguese given names